Martin Haug (30 January 1827 – 3 June 1876) was a German orientalist.

Biography
Haug was born at Ostdorf (today a part of Balingen), Württemberg. He became a pupil in the gymnasium at Stuttgart at a comparatively late age, and in 1848 he entered the Eberhard Karls University of Tübingen, where he studied oriental languages, especially Sanskrit. He afterwards attended lectures at the Georg-August University of Göttingen, and in 1854 settled as Privatdozent at the University of Bonn. In 1856 he moved to the University of Heidelberg, where he assisted Bunsen in his literary undertakings.

In 1859 he accepted an invitation to India, where he became superintendent of Sanskrit studies and professor of Sanskrit in Poona. Here his acquaintance with the Zend language and literature afforded him excellent opportunities for extending his knowledge of this branch of literature. Having returned to Stuttgart in 1866, he was called to Munich as professor of Sanskrit and comparative philology in 1868.

It was Dr. Haug who originally outlined the structure of the popular Sanskrit introductory books by Bhandarkar which was used throughout India in the early 20th century.

Haug died in Bad Ragaz.

Works
The result of his researches in Poona was the volume Essays on the sacred language, writings and religion of the Parsees (Bombay, 1862), of which a new edition, by E. W. West, greatly enriched from the posthumous papers of the author, appeared in 1878.

Haug published a number of other works of considerable importance to the student of the literatures of ancient India and Persia. They include:
 Die Pehlewisprache und der Bundehesch (1854)
 Die Schrift und Sprache der zweiten Keilschriftgattung (1855)
 Die fünf Gathas, edited, translated and expounded (1858–1860)
 an edition, with translation and explanation, of the Aitareya Brahnsana of the Rigveda (Bombay, 1863), which is accounted his best work in the province of ancient Indian literature
 A Lecture on an original Speech of Zoroaster (1865)
 An old Zend-Pahlavi Glossery (1867)
 Über den Charakter der Pehlewisprache (1869)
 Das 18. Kapitel des Wendidad (1869)
 Über das Ardai-Virafnameh (1870)
 An old Pahlavi-Pazand Glossary (1870)
 Vedische Rätselfragen und Rätselsprüche (1875)

References

  This work in turn cites:
 Adalbert Bezzenberger, Beiträge zur Kunde der indogermanischen Sprachen, vol. i., pp. 70 seq, which has the particulars of Haug's life and work.

1827 births
1876 deaths
People from Balingen
People from the Kingdom of Württemberg
German Indologists
German orientalists
German male non-fiction writers
University of Bonn alumni
University of Tübingen alumni
Academic staff of the Ludwig Maximilian University of Munich